Born to Spy is an Australian children's television series.

Born to Spy was created by Justine Flynn, produced by Naomi Just, Angie Fielder and Polly Staniford. It was written by Tiffany Zehnal, Tristram Baumber, Michelle Lim Davidson, Melissa Lee Speyer, Andrew Lee, David D.S. Park, Sophia Chung, Alice McCredie-Dando, Hyun Lee and Justine Flynn. It was directed by Chase Lee, Hyun Lee, Darlene Johnson, Neil Sharma and Justine Flynn.

Cast and characters 

 Hannah Kim as Yu Na Park
 Ocean Lim as Min Park
 Lulu Quirk as Dutch
 Alex Kis as Allegra 
 George Holahan-Cantwell as Raph
 Eduard Geyl as Talgat Foster
 Danny Kim as Joon Park
 Julia Yon as Soo-Jin Park
 Nicholas Hope as Mr. Potts
 Socratis Otto as George
 Shondelle Pratt as Ms Waters
 Miritana Hughes as Mr. Turei 
 Rajan Velu as Principal Singhal
 Matthew Backer as Mr. Brown

International broadcast 
In the United Kingdom, all episodes were added to BBC iPlayer on June 29, 2022. The series will make its British television debut on CBBC on July 25, 2022.

References

External links 
 
 

Australian children's television series
Australian Broadcasting Corporation original programming
2020s teen drama television series
2021 Australian television series debuts
Television series about children